Philip George Houthem Gell (20 October 1914 – 3 May 2001) was a British immunologist working in postwar Britain.

Together with Robin Coombs, he developed the Gell–Coombs classification of hypersensitivity. He was elected Fellow of the Royal Society in 1969.

References

1914 births
2001 deaths
British immunologists
Fellows of the Royal Society